Teresa Gutiérrez (25 October 1928 – 9 March 2010) was a Colombian actress best known for her roles in TV series. Since the genesis of the television broadcasting in Colombia in (1954) she has appeared in numerous series, including Seguro y urgente, Te voy a enseñar a querer, Los Victorinos and Como Pedro por su casa. She played La Marquesa Carmen Santillana de la Roquette in Telemundo's Zorro: La Espada y la Rosa.

Gutiérrez was the mother of actor Miguel Varoni and actress María Margarita Giraldo Gutiérrez and she was a grandmother of Majida Issa.

Early life
She was born in Bogotá, Colombia. She began her acting career through her father Carlos Gutierrez Riaño, as he was the artistic director of the radio station Nueva Granada. "Well my dad, Carlos Gutierrez Riaño, and I were testing a microphone. I was 14 years old.  I took it and said 'This is the station Nueva Granada, Bogota, Colombia, South America.' Then he said, on Monday you start working with me."

Filmography

Film

Television

Radio drama
El derecho de nacer

References

External links

Murió Teresa Gutierrez

1928 births
2010 deaths
Colombian people of Argentine descent
Colombian television actresses
Colombian film actresses
20th-century Colombian actresses
21st-century Colombian actresses